Gamze Taşcıer (born 10 December 1982) is a Turkish pharmacist and politician from the Republican People's Party.

She represents Ankara (I) in the Grand National Assembly of Turkey.

References 

1982 births
Living people
21st-century Turkish politicians
21st-century Turkish women politicians
Turkish pharmacists
Members of the 27th Parliament of Turkey
Republican People's Party (Turkey) politicians